Two soundtrack albums were released for 500 Days of Summer. The first of the two soundtrack albums titled 500 Days of Summer: Music from the Motion Picture featured various pop songs from the film whose tracklist was released on June 24, 2009, and the soundtrack released through Sire Records launched on July 13, 2009. The second album titled 500 Days of Summer: Score from the Motion Picture features original score composed by Mychael Danna and Rob Simonsen. It was released on August 3, 2009.

500 Days of Summer: Music from the Motion Picture

Track listing

Reception 
Andrew Leahey of Allmusic rated the album three and a half stars out of five, saying "With music playing such an integral role in the story line, it's refreshing to see that the accompanying soundtrack does its job well, distilling the characters' record collections (not to mention the movie's quirky, nostalgic ambiance) into one eclectic track list." A review from Sputnikmusic called it as "a mandatory component to the movie for those who loved it" and "a worthwhile listen even for those who didn't". Jeniffer Cooke of PopMatters said that " The music isn’t just confined to the soundtrack — it colors the story to the point where it almost becomes another character in the script".

Charts

500 Days of Summer: Score from the Motion Picture

Track listing

References

External links 

 
 

2009 soundtrack albums
Sire Records soundtracks
Romance film soundtracks
Drama film soundtracks
Various artists albums